The Melius-Bentley House is a historic home located in the towns of Ancram, Columbia County and Pine Plains, Dutchess County, New York. It was placed on the National Register of Historic Places on August 11, 1982, and preserves several rare architectural features. The house is situated on a  parcel of wooded land on Mount Ross Road (County Route 50). The lot is divided by the Dutchess–Columbia County border.

References

Houses on the National Register of Historic Places in New York (state)
Federal architecture in New York (state)
Houses completed in 1717
National Register of Historic Places in Dutchess County, New York
Houses in Columbia County, New York
1717 establishments in the Province of New York